Green Mansions is a 1959 American adventure romance film directed by Mel Ferrer. It is based upon the 1904 novel Green Mansions by William Henry Hudson. The film starred Audrey Hepburn (who at the time was married to Ferrer) as Rima, a jungle girl who falls in love with a Venezuelan traveller played by Anthony Perkins. Also appearing in the film were Lee J. Cobb, Sessue Hayakawa and Henry Silva. The score was by Heitor Villa-Lobos and Bronislau Kaper.

The film was intended to be the first of several projects directed by Ferrer and starring his wife, but ultimately this was the only one released. It was one of the few critical and box office failures of Hepburn's career.  Vincente Minnelli had originally been slated to direct the film, but delays in the project led Metro-Goldwyn-Mayer to choose Ferrer to direct.

The film was the first feature film to be photographed using Panavision lenses for 35mm anamorphic widescreen cinematography; however, the process listed on the titles was CinemaScope, the 35mm anamorphic widescreen process developed in the early 1950s by 20th Century-Fox in conjunction with the U.S. optical company Bausch and Lomb.  MGM resented having to both rent the special lenses and pay a royalty to 20th for use of the CinemaScope credit on their films, so they engaged Panavision, a then small Los Angeles-area manufacturer of anamorphic projection lenses for theaters, to develop anamorphic lenses for photographing MGM's widescreen productions.  Given the popularity and public awareness of the CinemaScope brand, MGM entered in to an agreement with 20th to continue paying for the use of the CinemaScope title on its productions while actually using the new Panavision lenses and listing a small credit elsewhere in the titles, "Process Lenses by Panavision".  Projected in the theater, the processes are identical in terms of the size of the film used and the screen width and height.  NOTE:  By the late 1960s, 20th had adopted Panavision for use on its own 35mm anamorphic widescreen productions and withdrew the CinemaScope lenses from the market where Panavision had already become the motion picture industry's consensus choice due to its reputation for superior optical performance.

Plot
A young man named Abel narrowly escapes Caracas, Venezuela after it is overtaken by rebels. He decides to seek revenge, as his father, the former Minister of War, was killed. After getting supplies, he takes a canoe to the far shore, where he is nearly killed by a jaguar, but is saved by the native people.

He decides to prove his bravery by not moving once he sees the chief, Runi and telling his story. The natives are impressed, and do not kill him. After a while, Runi's son Kua-ko, who has lived with the missionaries of Caracas and speaks English, tells Abel that Runi has agreed so long as he does not harm them, they will not harm him. Abel agrees, and befriends Kua-ko, who tells him of the "Bird Woman", who killed his older brother, and that their tribe is not allowed in the nearby forest.

Abel ignores the warning and ventures into the forest, where he sees a young woman who quickly disappears. He returns to the natives and Kua-ko tells him that Runi wishes Abel to use his gun and kill the girl. He returns to the forest, but decides to warn the girl instead. He sees her again, but is bitten by a coral snake. The girl takes Abel to her home and tends his wound. Upon waking up, he meets the girl's grandfather, Nuflo, who tells him her name is Rima.

The next day, with his leg wounded by the snake, Abel meets Rima again and they begin to talk. Rima takes a liking to him, but Nuflo warns her that he will leave once his leg heals. Abel is soon able to walk without a cane, and Rima therefore begins showing him the forest. Abel tells her that he has come to like her as well, and Rima is confused. She goes to speak with her dead mother's spirit, and decides to return to where she came from to ask a village elder about her strange new feelings for Abel. Later, Abel and Rima travel to the edge of the forest, where he shows her Riolama, which she remembers as her village. Despite Nuflo's initial reluctance to take her, Rima forces him to show her the way by threatening his soul if he does not.

Abel decides it is time for him to return to the natives. He tells Runi of how Rima saved him, but neither he nor Kua-ko believe him. He quickly realizes that Kua-ko killed his brother and placed the blame on Rima, but is tied up. After a bravery test (withstanding bee and wasp stings without making a sound), Kua-ko and the natives make ready to enter the forest and kill Rima.

Abel escapes and warns Nuflo and Rima, and together they escape to Riolama, where Nuflo tells Abel that he cannot return to the village because he caused a massacre. He managed to help Rima and her mother, and promised to take care of Rima, but was ashamed at his part in the massacre. Rima overhears, and curses Nuflo. She then rushes down to Riolama, where she faints in the heat. Abel follows and takes her to safety. When she awakens, Abel tells her how he has come to love her, and Rima does also, having only come to decipher her strange feelings and now recognizing them as love for him.

Rima steals away while Abel is asleep to go back to Nuflo and apologize, but when she finds him, the natives have burnt their home and he is nearly dead. She asks his forgiveness, and with his last words Nuflo tries to warn her of the natives. She quickly discovers for herself, and races through the forest to escape. Kua-ko burns the great tree where she has hidden. Meanwhile, Abel awakens and realizes what Rima has done. He quickly follows and finds Kua-ko, who teases that he killed her. The two fight into a stream, where Abel manages to drown Kua-ko.

Abel remembers a flower Rima told him of, which, if it disappears in one place, blossoms in another close by. He finds the flower, and not far off, Rima herself, who extends her hand.

Cast

 Audrey Hepburn – Rima
 Anthony Perkins – Abel
 Lee J. Cobb – Nuflo
 Sessue Hayakawa – Runi
 Henry Silva – Kua-ko
 Nehemiah Persoff – Don Panta
 Michael Pate – Priest
 Estelle Hemsley – Cla Cla

Critical reception
Although considerable effort had been made to produce a faithful and convincing rendering of the book, the film was not reviewed kindly by critics at the time and was not a commercial success.

Production notes
In 1933 after the success of the film Bird of Paradise (1932), RKO Pictures tried to reunite the star couple Dolores del Río and Joel McCrea in Green Mansions. However, the project was postponed and finally was canceled. Twenty-five years later, the project was resumed by Edmund Grainger and Mel Ferrer with MGM.

Ferrer traveled to South America to select possible filming locations, but eventually concluded that the jungles there were too dense and dark to allow their use in the action sequences of the film.  He did arrange for nearly an hour of jungle footage to be filmed south of Orinoco and in the Parahauri Mountains, much of which was incorporated into the film.  The action sequences were filmed on indoor stages and at Lone Pine, California.

Ferrer had several snakes and birds native to the Venezuelan jungle captured and shipped to Hollywood for use in filming.  He also brought a baby deer to the residence he shared with Hepburn, and they raised it for several months prior to filming so that it could be used in several scenes where Rima interacted with the forest creatures.

Music

Villa-Lobos
The Brazilian composer Heitor Villa-Lobos was originally commissioned to write the full score for the film. However, his music was inspired by the original novel, rather than the film adaptation.

Unhappy with the way his music had been used, Villa Lobos edited his full score into a cantata, Forest of the Amazon (Floresta do Amazonas). It was premiered in 1959 in New York City with the Symphony of the Air and the soprano Bidu Sayão under the composer's direction. The same forces recorded it in stereophonic sound for United Artists Records, which released it on LP and reel-to-reel tape.  The recording had a limited release on CD.

Alfred Heller, a friend and associate of Villa Lobos, made a modern digital recording of the complete uncut cantata (74 minutes) with soprano Renee Fleming, along with the Moscow Radio Symphony Orchestra.  He wrote on the Amazon website that Villa-Lobos had completed work on the full cantata in December 1958.  The United Artists recording used about 46 minutes of the cantata.

Kaper
A separate source from that quoted above indicates that the score by Villa-Lobos was composed from a translated script prior to completion of the editing of the film.  Though Villa-Lobos did some work on the edited film, the task of scoring the completed film was done by Bronislau Kaper, with Charles Wolcott conducting.

For the final score, Kaper wrote original material and used or adapted material composed by Villa-Lobos.  Additional music and arrangements were supplied by Sidney Cutner and Leo Arnaud.  The love theme "Song of Green Mansions" was composed by Kaper, with lyrics by Paul Francis Webster.

The complete Kaper score was issued on CD in 2005, on Film Score Monthly records.

Box office
Despite Hepburn's popularity the film was a box office disaster - it earned $1,190,000 in the US and Canada and $1.2 million elsewhere, resulting in a loss of $2,430,000.

Home media
The VHS film had only been available in cropped pan and scan transfers. Warner UK struck a deal with former special interest label Digital Classics to release Green Mansions. The film subsequently received an anamorphic NTSC DVD release in the UK on 6 April 2009.

See also
 List of American films of 1959

References

External links
 
 
 
 
 

1959 films
Metro-Goldwyn-Mayer films
Films based on British novels
Compositions by Heitor Villa-Lobos
Films directed by Mel Ferrer
1959 romantic drama films
Films set in Venezuela
American romantic drama films
Jungle girls
Films scored by Bronisław Kaper
1950s English-language films
1950s American films